Boar helmet may refer to:

 Germanic boar helmet
 Boar's tusk helmet